Arene briareus is a species of sea snail, a marine gastropod mollusc in the family Areneidae.

Description
The size of the shell varies between 4 mm and 9 mm.

Distribution
This species occurs in the Caribbean Sea and the Gulf of Mexico; in the Atlantic Ocean off Northern Brazil.

References

 Rosenberg, G., F. Moretzsohn, and E. F. García. 2009. Gastropoda (Mollusca) of the Gulf of Mexico, pp. 579–699 in Felder, D.L. and D.K. Camp (eds.), Gulf of Mexico–Origins, Waters, and Biota. Biodiversity. Texas A&M Press, College Station, Texas

External links
 

Areneidae
Gastropods described in 1881